Luria cinerea, common name, the Atlantic gray cowry, is a species of sea snail, a cowry, a marine gastropod mollusk in the family Cypraeidae, the cowries.

Subspecies Luria cinerea brasilensis Lorenz, 2002 (taxon inquirendum)

Distribution
N Carolina, USA - Colombia - E Brazil

Description 
The maximum recorded shell length is 45 mm.

Habitat 
Minimum recorded depth is 0 m. Maximum recorded depth is 1472 m.

References

External links
 Gmelin J.F. (1791). Vermes. In: Gmelin J.F. (Ed.) Caroli a Linnaei Systema Naturae per Regna Tria Naturae, Ed. 13. Tome 1(6). G.E. Beer, Lipsiae [Leipzig. pp. 3021-3910]
 Rosenberg, G.; Moretzsohn, F.; García, E. F. (2009). Gastropoda (Mollusca) of the Gulf of Mexico, Pp. 579–699 in: Felder, D.L. and D.K. Camp (eds.), Gulf of Mexico–Origins, Waters, and Biota. Texas A&M Press, College Station, Texas.

Cypraeidae
Gastropods described in 1791